In Style is the second solo album released by (then-)former lead singer of the New York Dolls, David Johansen. It was released in 1979 on Blue Sky Records.

Background
Johansen's self-titled solo debut earned favorable reviews but low sales. Consequently, In Style – featuring more pop-style songs such as "Melody" and "Swaheto Woman" – was designed to be more commercial.

"Swaheto Woman", released as a single, provided Johansen's first disco song. "Swaheto Woman" and three other tracks were cowritten by Johansen's friend and fellow New York Doll, Sylvain Sylvain. “She Knew She was Falling in Love” and “Wreckless Crazy” had both been performed by the Dolls after the departures of Thunders, Nolan and Kane.

In Style also features Ian Hunter and Dan Hartman.

Of the closing "Flamingo Road", Johnny Depp remarked: "I think it's about his experience of losing his wife to Steven Tyler, and the words are beautifully written, beautifully execuited. The whole record's great. Johansen was doing some great shit back then."

Track listing
"Melody" (David Johansen, Ronnie Guy) (2:58)
"She" (David Johansen, Buz Verno) (2:21)
"Big City" (David Johansen) (4:09)
"She Knew She Was Falling in Love" (David Johansen, Sylvain Sylvain) (3:46)
"Swaheto Woman" (David Johansen, Sylvain Sylvain) (5:05)
"Justine" (David Johansen) (4:34)
"In Style" (David Johansen) (4:08)
"You Touched Me Too" (David Johansen, Johnny Ráo) (2:23)
"Wreckless Crazy" (David Johansen, Sylvain Sylvain) (3:17)
"Flamingo Road" (David Johansen, Sylvain Sylvain) (6:02)

Personnel
Mick Ronson – producer, guitar
David Johansen – keyboards, guitar, vocals, producer
Stan Bronstein – saxophone
Ronnie Guy – piano
Dan Hartman – bass, backing vocals
Ian Hunter – acoustic piano on "Flamingo Road"
Frankie LaRocka – drums, backing vocals
Tom Mandel – organ
Johnny Ráo – guitar
Dave Still – engineer, backing vocals
Sylvain Sylvain – backing vocals 
Gary Green – backing vocals
Tommy Trask – guitar, backing vocals
Buz Verno – bass
Gene Orloff – orchestra conductor on "Melody", arranged by David Johansen and Mick Ronson

Technical
Harvey Goldberg – engineer
George Marino –  mastering
Paula Scher – design
Richard Avedon – cover and sleeve photography

References

David Johansen: In Style

1979 albums
Albums produced by Mick Ronson
David Johansen albums
Blue Sky Records albums